The Real Housewives of Orange County is an American reality television series that began airing March 21, 2006, and airs on Bravo. Set in Orange County, California, and created by Scott Dunlop, it is the first The Real Housewives installment in the franchise. The Real Housewives of Orange County is a voyeuristic look into the wealthy lives of these housewives, as they shop, get plastic surgery, gossip, fight and live lavishly. The financial crisis, the beginning of which coincided almost exactly with the first season's broadcast, has since trimmed the housewives' lifestyles with job losses, evictions, mortgage defaults, foreclosures, and marital stress—all recorded in progressive seasons of the show. The upcoming seventeenth season chronicles five women in Orange County— Tamra Judge, Heather Dubrow, Shannon Storms Beador, Gina Kirschenheiter, Emily Simpson —as they balance their personal and business lives, along with their social circle.

Former cast members featured over the previous fifteen seasons are: Kimberly Bryant (1), Jo De La Rosa (1-2), Vicki Gunvalson (1-13), Jeana Keough (1-5), Lauri Peterson (1-4), Tammy Knickerbocker (2-3), Quinn Fry (3), Lynne Curtin (4-5), Gretchen Rossi (4-8), Alexis Bellino (5-8), Peggy Tanous (6), Lydia McLaughlin (8, 12), Lizzie Rovsek (9), Meghan King Edmonds (10-12), Kelly Dodd (11-15), Peggy Sulahian (12), Braunwyn Windham-Burke (14-15), Elizabeth Lyn Vargas (15), Dr. Jen Armstrong (16), and Noella Bergener (16). 

, 289 original episodes of The Real Housewives of Orange County have aired.

Series overview

Episodes

Season 1 (2006)

Kimberly Bryant, Jo De La Rosa, Vicki Gunvalson, Jeana Keough and Lauri Peterson (then Waring) are introduced as series regulars.

Season 2 (2007)

Bryant departed as a series regular. Tammy Knickerbocker joined the cast.

Season 3 (2007–08)

De La Rosa departed as a series regular. Tamra Judge (then Barney) and Quinn Fry joined the cast.

Season 4 (2008–09)

Knickerbocker and Fry departed as series regulars. Peterson departed as a series regular after episode 3. Gretchen Rossi and Lynne Curtin joined the cast.

Season 5 (2009–10)

Keough departed as a series regular after episode 3. Alexis Bellino joined the cast.

Season 6 (2011)

Curtin departed as a series regular. Peggy Tanous joined the cast. Keough and Fernanda Rocha served in recurring capacities.

Season 7 (2012)

Tanous departed as a series regular. Heather Dubrow joined the cast. Sarah Winchester served in a recurring capacity.

Season 8 (2013)

Lydia McLaughlin joined the cast. Peterson served in a recurring capacity.

Season 9 (2014)

Rossi, Bellino and McLaughlin departed as series regulars. Lizzie Rovsek and Shannon Storms Beador joined the cast. Danielle Gregorio served in a recurring capacity.

Season 10 (2015)

Rovsek departed as a series regular, whilst serving in a recurring capacity. Meghan King Edmonds joined the cast.

Season 11 (2016)

Kelly Dodd joined the cast.

Season 12 (2017)

Dubrow departed as a series regular. McLaughlin rejoined the cast as a series regular. Peggy Sulahian joined the cast.

Season 13 (2018)

McLaughlin, King Edmonds and Sulahian departed as series regulars. Gina Kirschenheiter and Emily Simpson joined the cast.

Season 14 (2019)

Gunvalson departed as a series regular, whilst serving in a recurring capacity. Braunwyn Windham-Burke joined the cast.

Season 15 (2020–21)

Judge departed as a series regular. Elizabeth Lyn Vargas joined the cast.

Season 16 (2021–22)
Dodd, Windham-Burke and Vargas departed as series regulars. Dubrow rejoined the cast as a series regular. Jen Armstrong and Noella Bergener joined the cast. Nicole James served in a recurring capacity.

Season 17
Jen Armstrong and Bergener departed as series regulars. Judge rejoined the cast as a series regular. Taylor Armstrong served in a recurring capacity.

References

External links
 

Real Housewives of Orange County episodes
Orange County episodes